A woodlouse (plural woodlice) is any crustacean belonging to the suborder Oniscidea within the order Isopoda. They get their name from often being found in old wood.

Woodlice evolved from marine isopods which are presumed to have colonised land in the Carboniferous, though the oldest known fossils are from the Cretaceous period. They have many common names and although often referred to as terrestrial isopods, some species live semiterrestrially or have recolonised aquatic environments. Woodlice in the families Armadillidae, Armadillidiidae, Eubelidae, Tylidae and some other genera can roll up into a roughly spherical shape (conglobate) as a defensive mechanism; others have partial rolling ability, but most cannot conglobate at all.

Woodlice have a basic morphology of a segmented, dorso-ventrally flattened body with seven pairs of jointed legs, specialised appendages for respiration and like other peracarids, females carry fertilised eggs in their marsupium, through which they provide developing embryos with water, oxygen and nutrients. The immature young hatch as mancae and receive further maternal care in some species. Juveniles then go through a series of moults before reaching maturity.

While the broader phylogeny of the Oniscideans has not been settled, eleven infraorders/sections are agreed on with 3,937 species validated in scientific literature in 2004 and 3,710 species in 2014 out of an estimated total of 5,000–7,000 species extant worldwide.

Woodlice are widely studied in the contexts of evolutionary biology, behavioural ecology and nutrient cycling. They are popular as terrarium pets because of their varied colour and texture forms, conglobating ability and ease of care.

Recent research has shown that the grouping as traditionally defined may not be monophyletic, with some taxa like Ligia and possibly Tylidae more closely related to other marine isopod groups, though the majority of woodlice probably form a monophyletic clade.

Common names
Common names for woodlice vary throughout the English-speaking world. A number of common names make reference to the fact that some species of woodlice can roll up into a ball. Other names compare the woodlouse to a pig. The collective noun is a quabble of woodlice.

Common names include:

armadillo bug 
boat-builder (Newfoundland, Canada) 
butcher boy or butchy boy (Australia, mostly around Melbourne)
carpenter or cafner (Newfoundland and Labrador, Canada)
cheeselog (Reading, England)
cheesy bobs (Guildford, England)
cheesy bug (North West Kent, Gravesend, England)
chiggy pig (Devon, England) 
chisel pig
chucky pig (Devon, Gloucestershire, Herefordshire, England)
doodlebug (also used for the larva of an antlion and for the cockchafer)
gramersow (Cornwall, England)
hog-louse
monkey-peas (Kent, England)
pea bug (Medway, England)
peasie-bug (Kent, England)
pill bug (usually applied only to the genus Armadillidium) 
potato bug 
roll up bug 
roly-poly 
slater (Scotland, Ulster, New Zealand and Australia)
sow bug
wood bug (British Columbia, Canada)
wood pig (mochyn coed, Welsh)

Description and life cycle

The woodlouse has a shell-like exoskeleton, which it must progressively shed as it grows. The moult takes place in two stages; the back half is lost first, followed two or three days later by the front. This method of moulting is different from that of most arthropods, which shed their cuticle in a single process.

A female woodlouse will keep fertilised eggs in a marsupium on the underside of her body, which covers the under surface of the thorax and is formed by overlapping plates attached to the bases of the first five pairs of legs. They hatch into offspring that look like small white woodlice curled up in balls, although initially without the last pair of legs. The mother then appears to "give birth" to her offspring. Females are also capable of reproducing asexually.

Despite being crustaceans like lobsters or crabs, woodlice are said to have an unpleasant taste similar to "strong urine".

Pillbugs and pill millipedes

Pillbugs (woodlice of the family Armadillidiidae, also known as pill woodlice) can be confused with pill millipedes of the order Glomerida. Both of these groups of terrestrial segmented arthropods are about the same size. They live in very similar habitats, and both can roll up into a ball. Pill millipedes and pillbugs appear superficially similar to the naked eye. This is an example of convergent evolution.

Pill millipedes can be distinguished from woodlice on the basis of having two pairs of legs per body segment instead of one pair like all isopods. Pill millipedes have 12 to 13 body segments and about 18 pairs of legs, whereas woodlice have 11 segments and only seven pairs of legs.  In addition, pill millipedes are smoother, and resemble normal millipedes in overall colouring and the shape of the segments.

Ecology

Many members of Oniscidea live in terrestrial, non-aquatic environments, breathing through trachea-like lungs in their paddle-shaped hind legs (pleopods), called pleopodal lungs. Woodlice need moisture because they rapidly lose water by excretion and through their cuticle, and so are usually found in damp, dark places, such as under rocks and logs, although one species, the desert dwelling Hemilepistus reaumuri, inhabits "the driest habitat conquered by any species of crustacean". They are usually nocturnal and are detritivores, feeding mostly on dead plant matter.

A few woodlice have returned to water. Evolutionary ancient species are amphibious, such as the marine-intertidal sea slater (Ligia oceanica), which belongs to family Ligiidae. Other examples include some Haloniscus species from Australia (family Scyphacidae), and in the northern hemisphere several species of Trichoniscidae and Thailandoniscus annae (family Styloniscidae). Species for which aquatic life is assumed include Typhlotricholigoides aquaticus (Mexico) and Cantabroniscus primitivus (Spain).

Woodlice are eaten by a wide range of insectivores, including spiders of the genus Dysdera, such as the woodlouse spider Dysdera crocata, and land planarians of the genus Luteostriata, such as Luteostriata abundans.

Woodlice are sensitive to agricultural pesticides, but can tolerate some toxic heavy metals, which they accumulate in the hepatopancreas. Thus they can be used as bioindicators of heavy metal pollution.

Evolutionary history 
The oldest fossils of woodlice are known from the mid-Cretaceous around 100 million years ago, from amber deposits found in Spain, France and Myanmar, These include a specimen of living genus Ligia from the Charentese amber of France, the genus Myanmariscus from the Burmese amber of Myanmar, which belongs to the Synocheta and likely the Styloniscidae, Eoligiiscus tarraconensis which belongs to the family Ligiidae, Autrigoniscus resinicola which belongs to the family Trichoniscidae, and Heraclitus helenae which possibly belongs to Detonidae all from Spanish amber, and indeterminate specimens Charentese amber. The widespread distribution and diversification apparent of woodlice in the mid-Cretaceous implies that the origin of woodlice predates the breakup of Pangaea, likely during the Carboniferous.

As pests
Although woodlice, like earthworms, are generally considered beneficial in gardens for their role in controlling certain pests, producing compost and overturning the soil, they have also been known to feed on cultivated plants, such as ripening strawberries and tender seedlings.

Woodlice can also invade homes en masse in search of moisture and their presence can indicate dampness problems. They are not generally regarded as a serious household pest as they do not spread malady and do not damage sound wood or structures. They can be easily removed with the help of vacuum cleaners, chemical sprays, insect repellents, and insect killers, or by removing the damp.

As pets 
Woodlice have become a popular, low-maintenance household pet for children as well as a hobby for invertebrate and insect enthusiasts or collectors. Porcellionidae (sowbugs) and Armadillidae (pillbugs) are seen often as they are the most common terrestrial isopods in Europe and North America.

The isopod community has many resources for the care of the species. Many sites sell isopods for starting a colony, and to keep a bioactive vivarium clean. Isopods are also a popular species at reptile or invertebrate conventions either sold as pets or micro-feeders.

Morphs and varieties 

Amongst those who keep woodlice as pets, many species are bred for a certain coloration or variety of a species and are often recognized by a nickname that corresponds with their variety.
 
Popular varieties include Dalmatian (Porcellio scaber), Dairy Cow (Porcellio laevis), Montenegro (Armadillidium klugii), Zebra (Armadillidium maculatum), Magic Potion (Armadillidium vulgare), Powder Blue (Porcellionides pruinosus), Panda King and Rubber Ducky (Cubaris sp.), Tricolor (Merulanella sp.). The Rubber Ducky variety is currently to be one of the most desired and yet most expensive pillbug isopod to date, with a purchase of 6 individual specimens costing over one-hundred dollars. This popularity is likely due to its rarity and cute or innocent appearance of a duck face, having yellow bands across the back and front of its body;  all Cubaris species have this duck-billed shape on the head, but the Rubber Ducky variety has a coincidental coloring that lines up perfectly with this shape.
 
Many varieties also have sub-varieties that are even more rare or uncommon, such as the orange mutation or variant of Orange Dalmatian (Dalmatian), Powder Orange (Powder Blue), Pink Ducky (Rubber Ducky), and Orange Koi (Koi) which could be bred with by combining their solid orange variants with the variants in the parentheticals. Other sub-varieties include the Japanese line of Magic Potion, White Ducky, Champagne and Yellow versions of Zebra, Albinos and T-albinos, and many more. 
 
There are some terrestrial isopods, though very few, that have been known to be parthenogenic. More specifically, dwarf whites, but it is unclear whether other varieties such as dwarf purple produce the same. Because of this parthenogenesis, they reproduce quickly and can be great for use as pets or feeders in vivariums. 
 
Some coloration descriptions can be used to identify multiple species, such as Orange Dalmatian, a color-pattern combination seen in both Armadillidium vulgare and Porcellio scaber.
 
Orange Vigor or Tangerine (Armadillidium vulgare), Peach (Armadillidium nasatum), Orange (Porcellio laevis), Orange (Armadillidium werneri), Orange (Porcellio expansus), Orange, Orange Ember, or Spanish Orange (Porcellio scaber), Maple Orange (Oniscus asellus), Kumquat (Agabiformius lentus), and Persimmon (Venezillo parvus) are all simply orange varieties of their species, and when combined with other varieties of their species can make even more uncommon colorations unique to them.
 
Some unique species of woodlouse include the spiny isopods, though not much is known about them and there are only a few of them easily accessible for purchase online. These occasionally include Cristarmadillidium muricatum and a species from Thailand often referred to as simply "Thailand Spiny".

In the British Isles

Classification

There is general agreement that there are five main lineages in suborder Oniscidea, although the phylogenetic relationships between them are unsettled. Two main schemes for the classification that differ in which group is considered sister to the remaining oniscideans. One places Ligiidae in section Diplocheta, with the remaining families divided between four sections in infraorder Holoverticata. The other places Tylidae in infraorder Tylomorpha, with the remaining families placed in three sections in infraorder Ligiamorpha. The former scheme is presented below.

Infraorder/Section Diplocheta
Ligiidae
Infraorder Holoverticata
Section: Tylida
Tylidae
Section: Microcheta
Mesoniscidae
Section: Synocheta
Buddelundiellidae
Schoebliidae
Styloniscidae
Titaniidae
Trichoniscidae
Turanoniscidae
Section: Crinocheta
Agnaridae
Alloniscidae
Armadillidae
Armadillidiidae
Balloniscidae
Bathytropidae
Berytoniscidae
Cylisticidae
Delatorreiidae
Detonidae
Eubelidae
Halophilosciidae
Olibrinidae
Oniscidae
Philosciidae
Platyarthridae
Porcellionidae
Pudeoniscidae
Rhyscotidae
Scleropactidae
Scyphacidae
Spelaeoniscidae
Stenoniscidae
Tendosphaeridae
Trachelipodidae

See also

 Invertebrate iridescent virus 31 – a species of virus hosted by woodlice

Notes

References

External links

Further reading
 (lists all validated species of Oniscidea published up to the end of 2004)
 (lists most scientific publications on the biology of Oniscidea published in a European language until the year 2004.)
 (lists all genera published up to the end of 2001)

 
Isopoda
Terrestrial crustaceans
Detritivores